A demonym or gentilic is a word that identifies a group of people (inhabitants, residents, natives) in relation to a particular place. Demonyms are usually derived from the name of the place (hamlet, village, town, city, region, province, state, country, continent, planet, and beyond). Demonyms are used to designate all people (the general population) of a particular place, regardless of ethnic, linguistic, religious or other cultural differences that may exist within the population of that place. Examples of demonyms include Cochabambino, for someone from the city of Cochabamba; French for a person from France; and Swahili, for a person of the Swahili coast.

As a sub-field of anthroponymy, the study of demonyms is called demonymy or demonymics.

Since they are referring to territorially defined groups of people, demonyms are semantically different from ethnonyms (names of ethnic groups). In the English language, there are many polysemic words that have several meanings (including demonymic and ethnonymic uses), and therefore a particular use of any such word depends on the context. For example, the word Thai may be used as a demonym, designating any inhabitant of Thailand, while the same word may also be used as an ethnonym, designating members of the Thai people. Conversely, some groups of people may be associated with multiple demonyms. For example, a native of the United Kingdom may be called a British person, a Briton or, informally, a Brit.

Some demonyms may have several meanings. For example, the demonym Macedonians may refer to the population of North Macedonia, or more generally to the entire population of the region of Macedonia, a portion of which is in Greece. In some languages, a demonym may be borrowed from another language as a nickname or descriptive adjective for a group of people: for example, Québécois, Québécoise (female) is commonly used in English for a native of the province or city of Quebec (though Quebecer, Quebecker are also available).

In English, demonyms are always capitalized.

Often, demonyms are the same as the adjectival form of the place, e.g. Egyptian, Japanese, or Greek.

English commonly uses national demonyms such as Ethiopian or Guatemalan, while the usage of local demonyms such as Chicagoan, Okie or Parisian is less common. Many local demonyms are rarely used and many places, especially smaller towns and cities, lack a commonly used and accepted demonym altogether.

Etymology
National Geographic attributes the term demonym to Merriam-Webster editor Paul Dickson in a work from 1990. The word did not appear for nouns, adjectives, and verbs derived from geographical names in the Merriam-Webster Collegiate Dictionary nor in prominent style manuals such as the Chicago Manual of Style. It was subsequently popularized in this sense in 1997 by Dickson in his book Labels for Locals. However, in What Do You Call a Person From...? A Dictionary of Resident Names (the first edition of Labels for Locals) Dickson attributed the term to George H. Scheetz, in his Names' Names: A Descriptive and Prescriptive Onymicon (1988), which is apparently where the term first appears. The term may have been fashioned after demonymic, which the Oxford English Dictionary defines as the name of an Athenian citizen according to the deme to which the citizen belongs, with its first use traced to 1893.

Suffixation
Several linguistic elements are used to create demonyms in the English language. The most common is to add a suffix to the end of the location name, slightly modified in some instances. These may resemble Late Latin, Semitic, Celtic, or Germanic suffixes, such as -(a)n, -ian, -anian, -nian, -in(e), -a(ñ/n)o/a, -e(ñ/n)o/a, -i(ñ/n)o/a, -ite, -(e)r, -(i)sh, -ene, -ensian, -ard, -ese, -nese, -lese, -i(e), -i(ya), -iot, -iote, -k, -asque, -(we)gian, -onian, -vian, -ois(e), or -ais(e).

Prefixation
It is much rarer to find Demonyms created with a prefix. Mostly they are from Africa and the Pacific, and are not generally known or used outside the country concerned. In much of East Africa, a person of a particular ethnic group will be denoted by a prefix. For example, a person of the Luba people would be a Muluba, the plural form Baluba, and the language, Kiluba or Tshiluba. Similar patterns with minor variations in the prefixes exist throughout on a tribal level. And Fijians who are indigenous Fijians are known as Kaiviti (Viti being the Fijian name for Fiji). On a country level:
Botswana → Motswana (singular), Batswana (plural)
Burundi → Umurundi (singular), Abarundi (plural)
Eswatini → Liswati (singular), Emaswati (plural)
Lesotho → Mosotho (singular), Basotho (plural)

Non-standard examples
Demonyms may also not conform to the underlying naming of a particular place, but instead arise out of historical or cultural particularities that become associated with its denizens. In the United States such demonyms frequently become associated with regional pride such as the burqueño of Albuquerque, or with the mascots of intercollegiate sports teams of the state university system, take for example the sooner of Oklahoma and the Oklahoma Sooners.

Ethnonyms

Since names of places, regions and countries (toponyms) are morphologically often related to names of ethnic groups (ethnonyms), various ethnonyms may have similar, but not always identical, forms as terms for general population of those places, regions or countries (demonyms).

Fiction
Literature and science fiction have created a wealth of gentilics that are not directly associated with a cultural group. These will typically be formed using the standard models above. Examples include Martian for hypothetical people of Mars (credited to scientist Percival Lowell), Gondorian for the people of Tolkien's fictional land of Gondor, and Atlantean for Plato's island Atlantis.

Other science fiction examples include Jovian for those of Jupiter or its moons and Venusian for those of Venus. Fictional aliens refer to the inhabitants of Earth as Earthling (from the diminutive -ling, ultimately from Old English -ing meaning "descendant"), as well as Terran, Terrene, Tellurian, Earther, Earthican, Terrestrial, and Solarian (from Sol, the sun).

Fantasy literature which involves other worlds or other lands also has a rich supply of gentilics. Examples include Lilliputians and Brobdingnagians, from the islands of Lilliput and Brobdingnag in the satire Gulliver's Travels.

In a few cases, where a linguistic background has been constructed, non-standard gentilics are formed (or the eponyms back-formed). Examples include Tolkien's Rohirrim (from Rohan), the Star Trek franchise's Klingons (with various names for their homeworld), and the Sangheili from the Halo franchise, (also known as Elites in the game by humans, as well as players) named after their homeworld of Sanghelios.

See also

List of adjectival and demonymic forms of place names
List of adjectivals and demonyms for astronomical bodies
List of adjectivals and demonyms for continental regions
List of adjectivals and demonyms for subcontinental regions
List of adjectival and demonymic forms for countries and nations
List of adjectivals and demonyms for Australia
List of adjectivals and demonyms for Canada
List of adjectivals and demonyms for Cuba
List of adjectivals and demonyms for India
List of adjectivals and demonyms for Malaysia
List of adjectivals and demonyms for Mexico
List of adjectivals and demonyms for New Zealand
List of adjectivals and demonyms for the Philippines
List of adjectivals and demonyms for the United States
List of adjectivals and demonyms for former regions
List of adjectivals and demonyms for Greco-Roman antiquity
List of adjectivals and demonyms for fictional regions
List of adjectivals and demonyms for cities
List of regional nicknames
Macedonia naming dispute
Nationality
 -onym, especially ethnonym and Exonym and endonym

Notes

References

Sources

External links

www.geography-site.co.uk Alphabetical list of world demonyms.
www.everything2.com Demonyms of the World.
CIA World Factbook – NATIONALITY
www.peoplefrom.co.uk Demonyms of the United Kingdom.

 
Semantics
Types of words